Bridge End is a village in Northumberland, England. It is situated to the west of Hexham, on the north bank of the River South Tyne.

The North and South Tyne meet less than one kilometre downstream from the village. There is a pleasant walk from the Boat Inn along the bank of the South Tyne to the meeting of the waters. The Boat Inn was formerly the place of a ferry until the toll bridge was built across the river. The toll house still stands, but the old bridge was replaced in 1904 by a County structure. One of the two plaques on the bridge records that the contractor was W. T. Weir of Howdon-on-Tyne. The Newcastle and Carlisle Railway crosses the river by a strongly built iron bridge.

Governance 
Bridge End is in the parliamentary constituency of Hexham.

Economy
Bridge End has a paper mill on the South Tyne, which started in 1763 and still exists. A century ago a visitor described how the rags were converted into beautiful white paper. The mill employed 63 hands.

Landmarks 
The tollhouse stands at the southern end of the bridge and the building still has the original roof from which it is possible to see the original layout of the windows. However, by 2008, the southern window had been removed and replaced by a modern porch, and the northern window partially obscured by an extension.

Religious sites 
There is a Methodist church built in 1851. In appearance it resembles a barn rather than an ecclesiastical edifice.

References

External links

Villages in Northumberland